Générale Occidentale is a French investment company.

History 
The company was founded in 1969 by James Goldsmith, rapidly absorbing a large number of companies. In 1973, it took control of Générale Alimentaire and its brands Amora, Vandamme, Carambar, La Pie qui Chante and Francorusse.

In 1979, it bought Chocolat Poulain from Clin-Midy, and SEGMA with its brand Maille. Only one year later, the entire food arm of Générale Occidentale was sold to Boussois-Souchon-Neuvesel (BSN) (which became Danone in 1994).

Simultaneously, the group grew its publication arm, taking control of L'Express in 1977 and Presses de la Cité in 1986.

In 1987, James Goldsmith sold his share to Compagnie Générale d'Electricité (CGE). Générale Occidentale was no longer a subsidiary of CGE, and its assets were dispersed. Goldsmith's financial director Gilberte Beaux became the managing director of Générale Occidentale.

References

Investment companies of France